The Air Est JCD 03 Pelican is a French mid-wing, twin tailed, flying wing single-seat motor glider that was designed by Jean-Claude Debreyer and produced by Air Est Services of Marly, Moselle and supplied as a kit for amateur construction or as a complete aircraft.

Design and development
The Pelican has an unconventional layout, based on the Fauvel AV.36, with a low aspect ratio wing, twin rudders mounted at mid-span and a pusher configuration Solo 210 engine mounted in the rear fuselage producing .

The aircraft is constructed from fibreglass, with some surfaces fabric covered. The  span wing is semi-tapered, tapering outside the rudders and employs a Fauvel F4 17% airfoil. The fuselage is just  in length, making the aircraft very compact. The landing gear is monowheel gear, with a small tail wheel and outrigger wheels at midspan.

A variety of engines can be fitted.

In 1998 a completed aircraft was US$12,950 and a kit was US$8,000. The kit did not include the engine, propeller or instruments. Construction time from the supplied kit was estimated at 300 hours. One example was reportedly completed and flying in 1998.

Specifications (Pelican)

See also

References

External links
Pelican photos and three view

1980s French sailplanes
Homebuilt aircraft
Motor gliders
Single-engined pusher aircraft